The  is a home video game console developed and sold by Sega. The first of the sixth generation of video game consoles, it was released in Japan on November 27, 1998, in North America on September 9, 1999, and in Europe on October 14, 1999. The fifth and final home console produced by Sega, the Dreamcast is the successor to the Sega Saturn, whose commercial failure prompted the company to release it only four years after its predecessor's initial release. 

All licensed games for the Dreamcast were released on the GD-ROM format, a proprietary CD-based optical disc format jointly developed by Sega and Yamaha Corporation that was capable of storing up to 1 GB of data. The Dreamcast itself features regional lockout. 
While the higher-capacity DVD-ROM format was available during the console's development, its then-fledgling technology was deemed too expensive to implement at the time., which resulted in ramifications for Sega when competitors such as Sony's PlayStation 2 came to market; the Dreamcast was unable to offer DVD movie playback when the general public began switching from VHS to DVD, and its games were unable to take advantage of the DVD's higher storage capacity and lower cost. Furthermore, an exploit in the console's copy protection system via its support for the little-used MIL-CD format effectively allowed users to play many games burned onto CD-Rs, without any hardware modifications.

The Dreamcast's initial release in Japan had four launch titles, which were Virtua Fighter 3tb, Pen Pen TriIcelon, Godzilla Generations, and July. The North American debut featured 19 launch titles, which included highly anticipated ones such as Sonic Adventure, Soulcalibur, and NFL 2K. The European introduction was originally going to feature 10 launch titles, but the list increased to 15 as its delay from the original September 23 launch date allowed the inclusion of a handful of additional titles. Due to the similarity of the Dreamcast's hardware with Sega's own New Arcade Operation Machine Idea (NAOMI) arcade board, it saw several near-identical ports of arcade games. Plus, since the Dreamcast's hardware used parts similar to those found in personal computers (PCs) of the era, specifically ones with Pentium II and III processors, it also saw a handful of ports of PC games. American third-party publisher Electronic Arts (EA), which had extensively supported Sega's prior consoles beginning with the Sega Genesis, elected not to develop games for the Dreamcast due to a dispute with Sega over licensing.

Sega discontinued the Dreamcast's hardware on March 2001, and software support quickly dwindled as a result. Software largely trickled to a stop by 2002, though the Dreamcast's final licensed game on GD-ROM was Karous, released only in Japan on March 8, 2007, nearly coinciding with the end of GD-ROM production the previous month. The final first-party game for the Dreamcast was Puyo Puyo Fever, released as a Japanese exclusive on February 24, 2004.

This list documents all games officially released for the Dreamcast. It does not include homebrew games, which are documented at the list of Dreamcast homebrew games, and does not include any cancelled games, which are documented at the list of cancelled Dreamcast games.

Games 
There are  games that are known to have released on the console:

See also 
List of commercially released independently developed Dreamcast games for a list of homebrew games
List of Dreamcast online games
List of cancelled games for Sega consoles
Lists of video games

Notes

References

Dreamcast
Dreamcast